The 1979 San Francisco State Gators football team represented San Francisco State University as a member of the Far Western Conference (FWC) during the 1979 NCAA Division II football season. Led by 19th-year head coach Vic Rowen, San Francisco State finished the season with an overall record of 3–7 and a mark of 1–4 in conference play, tying for fifth place in the FWC with Cal State Hayward. For the season the team was outscored by its opponents 201 to 108. The Gators played home games at Cox Stadium in San Francisco.

Schedule

References

San Francisco State
San Francisco State Gators football seasons
San Francisco State Gators football